Maharda, also spelled Mhardeh or Muhardah, is a city in northern Syria, administratively part of the Hama Governorate, located about 23 kilometers northwest of Hama. It is situated along the Orontes River, near the Ghab plain. Nearby localities include Halfaya and Taybat al-Imam to the east, Khitab to the southeast, Maarzaf to the south, Asilah and Jubb Ramlah to the southwest, Shaizar, Safsafiyah, Tremseh and Kafr Hud to the west and Kafr Zita and al-Lataminah to the north.

According to the Syria Central Bureau of Statistics (CBS), Maharda had a population of 17,578 in the 2004 census. It is the center of Mahardah District, one of the Hama Governorate's five districts, and the nahiyah ("subdistrict") of Mahardah, which contained 21 localities with a combined population of 80,165 in 2004. Maharda's population was estimated to be 22,442 in 2010. Its inhabitants are predominantly Christians.

Maharda's residents mostly work in agriculture, industry and trade. The educational level of population is reported to be high. The climate in the city is mild in summertime and occasional snowfall may be seen in winter.

The Orontes River was recently dammed 3 kilometers north, and the Mahardah Dam on the Ghab plain is used to generate hydroelectric power. Maharda dates back to the same Hellenistic period of Apamea and the most notable archaeological remnant from this period is an old temple with stone doors and columns with Corinthian capitals transformed later into a church.

Ghada Shouaa, the first Syrian track and field athlete to win an Olympic gold medal, was born in Maharda as well as Patriarch Ignatius IV of Antioch.

Maharda is the nearest large town to Tremseh in which killings took place on 12 July 2012. Additionally, a suicide bomber killed three civilians and one security officer in Maharda on 14 July 2012.

During the Syrian Civil War, Maharda has been targeted by rebels, yet remained under government control. According to pro-government media, the rate of attacks on Maharda increased during the course of the 2017 Hama offensive.

See also
Cities and towns during the Syrian civil war
Ghada Shouaa
Ignatius IV of Antioch

References

Cities in Syria
Populated places in Mahardah District
Christian communities in Syria